Ma Faxiang (1953 – 13 November 2014) was a Chinese vice admiral (zhong jiang)  who served as Deputy Political Commissar of the People's Liberation Army Navy (PLAN). He came under investigation for corruption and committed suicide in November 2014.

Life and career
Ma Faxiang was born in 1953 in Dali County, Shaanxi Province.

Ma was appointed Political Commissar of the PLAN Armament Research Institute in July 2004, and attained the rank of rear admiral a year later. In July 2008, he was appointed Political Commissar of the Navy test and training base. He was elevated to Director of the Political Department of the Navy in June 2011, and attained the rank of vice admiral in 2012. In a 2013 report published by the American think tank The Jamestown Foundation, analysts considered Ma the top contender to succeed Admiral Liu Xiaojiang as the PLAN's next political commissar. In July 2013, he was promoted to Deputy Political Commissar of the PLAN.

Suicide
On 13 November 2014, Ma Faxiang jumped to his death from a building at the navy complex in Gongzhufen, Beijing. Ma had come under investigation for corruption by the Central Discipline Inspection Commission, and it is believed that he committed suicide to avoid disgrace and allow his family to receive his retirement benefits, although it was also said that he had suffered from depression. His suicide followed that of Rear Admiral Jiang Zhonghua under similar circumstances about two months before. Ma's corruption investigation is thought to be connected to the cases of the former vice chairmen of the Central Military Commission, Xu Caihou and Guo Boxiong.

People's Navy, the official newspaper of the PLAN, announced that Ma Faxiang had died of an illness. The official obituary called him "an excellent Communist Party member and an excellent political commander of the Navy". On 1 December 2014, his body was cremated at the Babaoshan Revolutionary Cemetery. Many current and former navy leaders, including Commander Wu Shengli and Political Commissar Liu Xiaojiang, attended the farewell ceremony, but top Communist Party and government leaders were notably absent.

References 

1953 births
2014 deaths
People's Liberation Army generals from Shaanxi
Suicides in the People's Republic of China
People's Liberation Army Navy admirals
People from Weinan
Suicides by jumping in China
Chinese military personnel who committed suicide